In mathematics, Osgood's lemma, introduced by , is a proposition in complex analysis.  It states that a continuous function of several complex variables that is holomorphic in each variable separately is holomorphic. The assumption that the function is continuous can be dropped, but that form of the lemma is much harder to prove and is known as Hartogs' theorem.

There is no analogue of this result for real variables. If we assume that a function  is globally continuous and separately differentiable on each variable (all partial derivatives exist everywhere), it is not true that  will necessarily be differentiable. A counterexample in two dimensions is given by

References

Theorems in complex analysis